Lycophidion variegatum, also known as the variegated wolf snake, is a species of small nocturnal snake in the family Lamprophiidae.  The species actively hunts lizards in small crevices, and is endemic to southern Africa.

References

Further reading
Branch, Bill. 2004. A Field Guide to Snakes and other Reptiles of Southern Africa. Third Revised Edition, Second impression. Sanibel Island, Florida: Ralph Curtis Books. 399 pp. . (Lycophidion variegatum, p. 76 + Plate 29).
Broadley DG. 1969. "A New Species of Lycophidion from Rhodesia (Serpentes: Colubridae)". Arnoldia 4 (27): 1–8. (Lycophidion variegatum, new species).

Colubrids
Snakes of Africa
Reptiles of Botswana
Reptiles of Eswatini
Reptiles of South Africa
Reptiles of Zambia
Reptiles of Zimbabwe
Reptiles described in 1969